Saint-Prosper-de-Champlain is a municipality of 516 people in the Les Chenaux Regional County Municipality, in Quebec, Canada. It is the smallest municipality in terms of population in the regional county.

Before September 4, 2010, it was known simply as Saint-Prosper.

History
The area opened up for colonization in the middle of the 19th century, and in 1850 the Parish of Saint-Prosper was established out of the territories of Sainte-Geneviève-de-Batiscan and Sainte-Anne-de-la-Pérade. It was named after Prosper of Aquitaine possibly by Bishop Joseph Signay who wanted to emphasize the "prosperity" of the first settlers, who were poor but brave. In 1853, its post office opened, and two years later, the Parish Municipality of Saint-Prosper was formed, with Augustin Massicotte as first mayor.

In 1861, Saint-Prosper had 1028 inhabitants, and at the start of 1900, there were nearly 1500 persons.

On December 31, 2001, it was transferred from the Francheville Regional County to the new Les Chenaux Regional County, following the creation of the new City of Trois-Rivières and the dissolution of the Francheville RCM.

Demographics
Population trend:
 Population in 2021: 482 (2016 to 2021 population change: -9.1%)
 Population in 2016: 530 
 Population in 2011: 505 
 Population in 2006: 541
 Population in 2001: 531
 Population in 1996: 548
 Population in 1991: 584

Private dwellings occupied by usual residents: 244 (total dwellings: 264)

Mother tongue:
 English as first language: 0%
 French as first language: 100%
 English and French as first language: 0%
 Other as first language: 0%

See also

 Charest River
 Rivière à Veillet
 Les Chenaux Regional County Municipality

References

Municipalities in Quebec
Incorporated places in Mauricie